Valerii Kryshen (born 1955) is a Ukrainian scientist, doctor of medicine and professor of general surgery.

Biography
Kryshen was born on 11 September 1955 in Dnipropetrovsk in what was then the Soviet Union to a medical family. He completed his medical degree in 1978 and began working in the surgical unit in Dnipropetrovsk city hospital. He chairs the general surgery department at Dnipropetrovsk State Medical Academy.

Achievements
Kryshen authored near the 400 scientific papers, research articles, manuals, monographs, state patents and inventions, ministerial instructions and branch directions. He supervised doctoral students and participated in thesis defense reviews. He was a certified member of the European Society of Surgery (ESS). He provided relevant commentary on the ESS website. He was on the faculty of Ukrainian and European Surgical Congresses and was a member of the scientific international committee at 8th World Gastric Cancer Congress.

Kryshen created a new school, exposing young surgeons to clinical practice and research. He presided over and was a member of the government examination graduating and post-graduating commission and committee of experts in connection with medical, scientific and educational licence certification of research institutions and higher educational establishments in Ukraine. He administered and supervised 7 magistrate, 6 candidate and 1 doctorate scientific degree theses.

Kryshen's professional interests include acute surgical diseases and abdominal trauma treatment along with new aspects and high technology  of elective and urgent surgery. He is included in Bristol Who`s who Registry in Medical Practice and High Education heading.
Kryshen is listed by Swiss international collection of Hubner's in biographic encyclopedia of successful Ukrainian "Who is who in Ukraine", published in Germany and included in Encyclopedia of Modern Ukraine, printed in Kyiv.

Awards and honors
Kryshen is a member of the National Academy of Sciences of Ukraine.

He was awarded several medals: Merited Inventor of USSR, Silver and Bronze Participant of Achievement Government Exhibition of USSR and UkSSR.

References

Sources
 Дніпропетровська державна медична академія:історія,події,особистості/до 95-річного ювілею/. Dnipropetrovsk state medical academy:to 95th anniversary. Kharkiv, 2011, p. 97
 Who is who in Ukraine /in Ukrainian / Kyiv, 1997.
 Кришень Валерій Павлович /in Ukrainian/ www.uk.m.wikipedia.org 
 Encyclopedia Modern Ukraine, Kyiv, 2014, vol. 15
 www.dsma.dp.ua
 Крышень Валерий Павлович / in Russian/ www.ru.m.wikipedia.org
 Professors of Dnipropetrovsk medical academy 1916-2019.”Porogy”,2020.-576 p./ in Ukrainian /

Ukrainian surgeons
1955 births
Living people
Scientists from Dnipro
Members of the National Academy of Sciences of Ukraine